The Pittsburgh gasometer explosion, or Equitable Gas explosion, was an accident that took place in Pittsburgh, Pennsylvania on the morning of November 14, 1927. The exact cause of the explosion is not known, but some of those repairing the leak were using acetylene torches.
There was a loud explosion, and three gasometers at the site exploded. A "dense mass of dust and smoke" rose from the ruins before igniting into a ball of fire reported as 100 feet in diameter, which rose further before burning out at a height of 1000 feet. Most buildings within a radius of half a mile were damaged, with windows being broken a mile away, causing upwards of $4 million worth of damage. It was reported that the explosion "caused lofty downtown skyscrapers to tremble and sway as if hit by an earthquake". 28 people were killed and hundreds were injured.

References

External links 
 Gas explosions in 1927 on Pittsburgh’s North Side
 Behind this picture lies a tragic story
 Golden Memories – Gas Explosion of 1927
 Firsthand account of explosion
 PITTSBURGH STORAGE GAS TANK EXPLODES; MANY DIE, 500 HURT; SQUARE MILE OF CITY IN RUINS
 Three Tragedies That Changed Pittsburgh
  1927 gas tank explosion-Pittsburgh, PA
 THE PITTSBURGH GAS EXPLOSION.
 Pittsburgh History: 1927 gas tank explosion

Explosions in 1927
Gas explosions in the United States
History of Pittsburgh
1927 in Pennsylvania